Blunstone is a surname. Notable people with the surname include:

 Colin Blunstone (born 1945), English singer and member of The Zombies
 Frank Blunstone (born 1934), English footballer